Miral is a real estate development, management and investment company responsible for the development and management of Yas Island in Abu Dhabi. In addition, the company owns and operates Warner Bros. World Abu Dhabi, Ferrari World and Yas Waterworld as well as the upcoming SeaWorld Abu Dhabi, all through its wholly owned subsidiary Farah Experiences.

References

Companies based in Abu Dhabi
Holding companies of the United Arab Emirates